The Ministry of Finance is the central specialized body of public administration, which develops and promotes the unique policy of training and managing public finances, applying financial levers in line with the requirements of the market economy. In its activity, the Ministry of Finance is governed by the Constitution of the Republic of Moldova, the laws of the Republic, the decrees of the President of the Republic of Moldova, the resolutions of the Parliament, the ordinances, the decisions and the provisions of the Cabinet of Moldova.

Objectives
Starting from the objectives of its activity program, the Ministry of Finance elaborates the necessary set of normative acts regulating the budgetary process, the taxation and accounting system, develops medium and long-term forecasts regarding the financial resources, finds solutions of public finance reform, ensures receipts and payments to the state budget. The ministry also elaborates and promotes the draft annual budget law and, if necessary, draft laws for amending and supplementing the annual state budget law.

On the other hand, this state structure carries out the execution of the state budget, administrative-territorial units' budgets, state social insurance budget income and compulsory health insurance fund income. The contracting and guaranteeing of state loans on the internal and external financial market, within the limits of the competences established by the law, the management and monitoring of the internal and external debts of the Government, are also related to the functions of the Ministry of Finance.

At the same time, the Ministry of Finance participates directly in the elaboration of the state customs policy, policy and evaluation of offers in the field of investments made from the funds of the state budget, as well as from external sources. It is also responsible for the implementation of the Republic of Moldova - European Union Action Plan.

On behalf of the State, the Ministry of Finance participates in the conclusion of bilateral and multilateral agreements with a view to promoting and protecting investments, avoiding double taxation and combating tax evasion.

Structure 

The Minister of Finance is responsible for fulfilling the tasks of the Ministry, representing the Ministry in relations with third parties, as well as with the legal and physical persons from the country or abroad. The Deputy Ministers shall exercise the powers delegated by the Minister of Finance. At the same time, the Minister is personally responsible for the way the budgetary means intended to ensure the ministry's activity are used, and to ensure the integrity of financial means and material assets at the disposal of the ministry concerned.

The ministry has the following subordinated institutions:

 State Tax Service
 Customs Service
 Public Procurement Agency
 Financial Inspection

List of ministers

External links
  Official website

Finance
Moldova